The 2018–19 Ekstraklasa season was Śląsk's 73rd since their creation, and their 11th continuous season in the top league of Polish football.

The season covered the period from 1 July 2018 to 30 June 2019.

Transfers

Players in

Players out

Players

First team squad

Friendlies

Summer

Winter

Regular season

Fixtures

League table

Polish Cup

References

Śląsk Wrocław
Śląsk Wrocław seasons